The 1995 Tour du Haut Var was the 27th edition of the Tour du Haut Var cycle race and was held on 18 February 1995. The race started and finished in Draguignan. The race was won by Marco Lietti.

General classification

References

1995
1995 in road cycling
1995 in French sport